Feliciano Juntareal (born 20 January 1934) is a Filipino sailor. He competed in the Dragon event at the 1964 Summer Olympics.

References

External links
 

1934 births
Living people
Filipino male sailors (sport)
Olympic sailors of the Philippines
Sailors at the 1964 Summer Olympics – Dragon
Place of birth missing (living people)